The Oppland Regiment was a Norwegian infantry regiment, formed in 1657 and stationed at Elverum. The area of population east of the river Leiret (literally the camp) adjacent to Christiansfjell Fortress was built up by the garrison and supporting merchants and craftsmen, who settled nearby. The regiment was disbanded in 2002.

Regiments of Norway
1657 establishments in Norway
Military units and formations established in 1657
Military units and formations disestablished in 2002